HSMP may refer to:
Highly Skilled Migrant Programme
High Speed Messaging Package